Mohamad Aizat Safuan bin Razali (born 10 March 1999) is a Malaysian professional footballer who plays as a midfielder for Malaysia Super League club Perak.

References

External links 
 

1999 births
Living people
Malaysian footballers
Association football midfielders
Perak F.C. players
Malaysia Super League players